This article contains a list of encyclicals of Pope Gregory XVI.  Pope Gregory XVI issued nine papal encyclicals during his reign as pope:

Documents of Pope Gregory XVI
Gregory 16